Elections to the Madhya Pradesh Legislative Assembly were held in October 1977. The Janata Party won a majority of seats and Kailash Chandra Joshi was sworn in as the new Chief Minister.

The number of constituencies in Madhya Pradesh were increased to 320, following the recommendation of the Delimitation Commission of India.

Result 
Source:

Elected Members

References

1977
1977
Madhya Pradesh